The 2012–13 season was Dukla Prague's second consecutive season in the Czech First League.

Players

Squad information

Transfers 
Dukla lost the services of loan players Ivan Lietava and Ondřej Švejdík, who did not stay on at the club following the end of the previous season. Midfielder Marek Hanousek, who stayed at Dukla on loan after signing for Plzeň the previous winter, concluded his loan and joined up with his new teammates. Defender David Mikula, who had spent the second half of the season away on loan, left the club. Forward Jan Pázler signed for Jablonec in the summer of 2012 but remained at Dukla on a season-long loan.

Six players went out on loan, these were: Michal Šmíd and Ondřej Šiml, both to Bohemians 1905, Miroslav Marković (to České Budějovice), Tomáš Pospíšil (to Baník Most), Matěj Marič (to TJ Kunice) and Jakub Sklenář (to Pardubice).

Defender Ondřej Vrzal finally became a Dukla player after more than two years at the club on loan from Plzeň. Forward Zbyněk Pospěch joined from local rivals Slavia Prague, and the club's defence was boosted by the loan signing of Lukáš Štetina as well as the permanent signing of Spaniard José Romera. Midfielders Luboš Kalouda and Tomáš Borek joined the club. Midfielder Tomáš Berger returned to Juliska after an unsuccessful loan period in Plzeň.

In the winter transfer window, Jan Pázler cut his loan at Dukla short and headed to Jablonec ahead of schedule. Another striker left; Miroslav Marković, who had been out on loan, signed a deal with fellow First League side Brno. The club brought in a second Spaniard, Néstor Albiach as an additional striker.

Management and coaching staff

Source: fkdukla.cz

Statistics

Appearances and goals 
 Starts + Substitute appearances.

|}

Goalscorers

Home attendance

Czech First League

Results by round

Results summary

League table

Matches

July

August

September

October

November

February

March

April

May

June

Cup 

As a First League team, Dukla entered the Cup at the second round stage. In the second round, Dukla faced third league side FK Kolín, who they defeated 1–0 by way of a first-half goal from Jan Svatonský. The third round match at second league side 1. HFK Olomouc was a closer affair; with Olomouc leading 2–0 with just eight minutes remaining, goals from Přeučil and Marek pushed the game to a penalty shootout, in which Dukla were victorious.

In the fourth round, Dukla lost in the first leg of their 31 October tie against fellow First League side Sigma Olomouc by a single goal in front of just 266 spectators. In the return leg, four weeks later, the game had an extraordinary amount of injury time after the referee had to be replaced during the match. Ten minutes into first-half injury time, leading thanks to two Jan Pázler goals, Dukla were in a good position, but Olomouc scored twelve minutes into stoppage time and went on to score their second goal of the game and third of the tie in the second half, to which Dukla had no answer. Dukla were therefore eliminated from the competition in the fourth round for the second successive season.

References

Cited texts

Dukla Prague
FK Dukla Prague seasons